Yinghai may refer to:

 Yinghai, Beijing, subdistrict of Daxing District
 Yinghai Subdistrict, Jiaozhou, Shandong